Maksym Koval (born 12 December 1996) is a Ukrainian Paralympic athlete. He made his maiden Paralympic appearance representing Ukraine at the 2020 Summer Paralympics held in Tokyo, Japan.

Career 
He clinched gold medal in the men's F20 shot put event during the 2020 Summer Paralympics.

Initially the gold medal in the shot put event was awarded to Malaysia's Muhammad Ziyad Zolkefli who also set a new world record twice, and broke the national record with a 17.94m throw during his 3rd throw at the final. However, he was later disqualified for not showing up on the court on time and a Ukrainian official had also shown his dissent over the gold medal being initially awarded to Zolkefli. Koval was awarded the gold medal.

The incident sparked public outcry in Malaysia, and Koval was subjected to social media abuse.

References 

1996 births
Living people
Ukrainian male shot putters
Paralympic gold medalists for Ukraine
Athletes (track and field) at the 2020 Summer Paralympics
Paralympic athletes of Ukraine
Paralympic medalists in athletics (track and field)
Medalists at the 2020 Summer Paralympics
World Para Athletics Championships winners